Acyphas is a genus of tussock moths in the family Erebidae erected by Jacob Hübner in 1819.

Species
Acyphas amphideta Turner, 1902
Acyphas chionitis Turner, 1902
Acyphas fulviceps Walker, 1855
Acyphas leptotypa Turner, 1904
Acyphas leucomelas Walker, 1855
Acyphas pelodes Lower, 1893
Acyphas semiochrea (Herrich-Schäffer, [1855])

References

Lymantriinae
Moth genera